Crème de banane is a sweet, banana-flavored liqueur, usually bottled at 17–25% ABV. It is mostly used in alcoholic drinks but also in cooking; it is an ingredient of various cocktails and desserts.

Cooking
Crème de banane can be used as a syrup on frozen desserts. In some baked dishes, it may be added to obtain a strong banana flavor.

Production

Companies such as Marie Brizard, Lucas Bols, and DeKuyper make this liqueur. It is based on neutral-tasting, unaged grape brandy flavored by means of infusion or maceration.

Fruit liqueurs
Bananas